Circinaria caesiocinerea is a species of lichen belonging to the family Megasporaceae. It was first described as Lecanora caesiocinerea in 1869 by William Nylander, but was transferred to the genus Circinaria in 2010 by Anders Nordin, Sanja Savić, and Leif Tibell.

References

Pertusariales
Lichen species
Taxa named by William Nylander (botanist)
Lichens described in 1869